The  was a political party in Japan that merged with the Democratic Party for the People on 26 April 2019. It had 2 out of the 475 seats in the House of Representatives, and 3 in the 242-member House of Councillors prior to merging. The party adopted the name Liberal Party in October 2016 in preparation for an expected general election in early 2017.

History

Foundation
The party's foundation lay in the wake of the December 2012 general election, in which the Tomorrow Party of Japan's membership in the 480-seat House of Representatives was reduced from 61 members to just 9. Tension between President Yukiko Kada and former People's Life First party leader Ichirō Ozawa increased to the point that on 26 December 2012 the party's remaining Diet members that were aligned with Ozawa held a meeting in spite of Kada's instruction not to do so. Members aligned with Kada announced their intention to leave the party and the following day Kada and Ozawa agreed to split the party, just one month after it had formed.

Merger with Taro Yamamoto
The party changed its name to People's Life Party & Taro Yamamoto and Friends in December 2014. The name change was apparently imposed by Yamamoto Tarō as a condition for keeping the party from disbanding.

July 2016 House of Councillors election

In October 2015 the party expressed the need for the opposition to coordinate in order to overthrow the Abe government, which it sees as a threat to peace and democracy. It specifically outlined a strategy for the 2016 House of Councillors election, similar to the Italian coalition the Olive Tree, where each party keeps its members and identity, while fighting elections under the same banner. During the nomination period for the July 2016 election, the party signed an agreement with the Democratic, Communist and Social Democratic parties to field a jointly-endorsed candidate in each of the 32 districts in which only one seat is contested, uniting in an attempt to take control of the House from the Liberal Democratic Party/Komeito coalition.

Two of the party's three councillors, Ryo Shuhama and Ryoko Tani, announced their intention to retire when their terms expired in July 2016. In April 2016 Shuhama cited the need to care for a seriously ill family member as his reason for not seeking a third term in office. Tani was approached by several parties in the lead up to the election, but Ozawa demanded she remain with the party, as her defection would have meant the party fell below the minimum requirement of five Diet members and lost its official party status. In June 2016 Tani announced her decision to remain with the party until the election, but not seek a second term.

In addition to the independent candidates endorsed by the party subject to the agreement with the other opposition parties, the People's Life Party nominated five candidates for the 48-seat national proportional representation block. The party's number one candidate was Ai Aoki, who had previously served a partial term in the House of Councillors and three terms in the House of Representatives. Former Nagasaki Prefectural Assembly member Seiichi Suetsugu was third on the party's ballot and former councillor Yumiko Himei was listed fourth.

Party member and former Iwate Prefectural Assembly member Eiji Kidoguchi won in the Iwate at-large district as an opposition-backed independent candidate and confirmed he would join the party's Diet group shortly after the election. In the National Block the party received 1.9% of the vote, entitling it to one of the 48 seats being contested. Aoki received 68.9% of the votes cast for the party's five candidates, meaning she was awarded the party's seat. The two seats won meant the party retained the five members necessary to maintain official party status within the Diet.

Former party president Yuko Mori also won as an opposition-backed independent candidate in the Niigata at-large district, which she had previously represented for two terms from 2001 until 2013. However, despite being a member of the party, she chose to sit in the House as an independent. When announcing her decision two weeks after the election, Mori's reasons included the fact that she campaigned as an independent, and also that she had signed an agreement with a citizens' group in which she promised to sit as an independent "for the time being", however she could not specify how long that would be.

Liberal Party (October 2016 – April 2019)
In October 2016 the party was rebranded as the Liberal Party in preparation for an expected general election in early 2017. However, the two Liberal Party MPs resolved to run as independents, eventually retaining their seats as an informal bloc in the 2017 election.

The party merged into the Democratic Party for the People in April 2019. Leftist factions inside the party refused to merge into the DPFP and founded Reiwa Shinsengumi.

Ideology 
The Liberal Party support consumer rights and advocate lower taxes. The party oppose the Comprehensive and Progressive Agreement for Trans-Pacific Partnership and support abandoning nuclear power.

Party presidents

Diet members

House of Representatives
Ichirō Ozawa (Iwate 4th district)

House of Councillors
Eiji Kidoguchi (Iwate)
Ai Aoki (National block)
Tarō Yamamoto (Tokyo)
Yūko Mori (Niigata)

Election results

House of Representatives

House of Councillors

References

2012 establishments in Japan
Political parties established in 2012
2019 disestablishments in Japan
Political parties disestablished in 2019
Defunct liberal political parties
Defunct political parties in Japan
Centrist parties in Japan
Centre-left parties in Asia
Environmentalism in Japan
Liberal parties in Japan
Pacifism in Japan
Pacifist parties
Social liberal parties